The women's 200 metre breaststroke event, included in the swimming competition at the 1956 Summer Olympics, took place on November 29–30, at the Swimming and Diving Stadium. In this event, swimmers covered four lengths of the 50-metre (160 ft) Olympic-sized pool employing the breaststroke. It was the seventh appearance of the event, which first appeared at the 1924 Summer Olympics in Paris. A total of 14 competitors from 10 nations participated in the event. This was a decrease from the 1952 Summer Olympics (33 competitors from 19 nations), because the breaststroke event was split into the 200m orthodox breaststroke and the 100m butterfly event.

Records
Prior to this competition, the existing world and Olympic records were:

Hungarian Éva Székely originally held the Olympic record in the event after swimming a time of 2:51.7 min four years ago. However Székely had used the butterfly stroke for her swim, which was now disallowed as a new 100 metres event had been introduced. Éva Novák-Gerard's time of 2:54.0 min in 1952 at the same event was instead replaced as the current Olympic record.

The following records were established during the competition:

Ursula Happe's Olympic record was set using a technique of swimming long distances underwater during her run. This technique would later be disallowed by FINA in the late 1950s to ensure the majority of the race was swum on the surface.

Results

Heats

Finals

Sources

References

Women's breaststroke 200 metres
1956 in women's swimming
Women's events at the 1956 Summer Olympics